The 2020–21 season was the 113th season in the existence of LASK and the club's fourth consecutive season in the top flight of Austrian football. In addition to the domestic league, LASK participated in this season's editions of the Austrian Cup and participated in the UEFA Europa League. The season covered the period from 1 August 2020 to 30 June 2021.

Players

First-team squad

Out on loan

Pre-season and friendlies

Competitions

Overview

Austrian Bundesliga

Regular stage

Results summary

Results by round

Matches
The league fixtures were announced on 9 July 2020.

Championship round

Results summary

Results by round

Matches

Austrian Cup

UEFA Europa League

Qualifying rounds

Group stage

The group stage draw was held on 2 October 2020.

Statistics

Goalscorers

References

External links

LASK seasons
LASK
LASK